The WFTDA North Central Regional Tournament or WFTDA North Central Region Playoffs was one of four annual roller derby regional qualifying tournaments for the WFTDA Championships.

The Tournament was organised by the Women's Flat Track Derby Association (WFTDA). Full WFTDA members in the North Central Region were eligible for ranking, and the top ten leagues would qualify for the North Central Regional Tournament, with the top three finalists qualifying for the Championships. Together, the four qualifying tournaments and Championships were termed the "Big 5". Starting with the 2013 WFTDA season, WFTDA's regions were discontinued in favor of an overall-rankings based system, and a new playoff format was created.

Championships

2009 Brawl of America
On September 20, 2009, the Windy City Rollers defeated the Mad Rollin' Dolls (Dairyland Dolls) 150-56 in the North Central championship bout. The Detroit Derby Girls beat the Cincinnati Rollergirls (Black Sheep) 126-62 to place 3rd.

References

Recurring sporting events established in 2009
North Central Region (WFTDA)
Roller derby competitions
Women's Flat Track Derby Association